State Trunk Highway 176 (often called Highway 176, STH-176 or WIS 176) was a state highway in the U.S. state of Wisconsin. It ran east–west between the Illinois border southeast of South Wayne and Wiota.  Control over the road was given to Lafayette County in 1999; it is now designated as County Highway D.

Route description
WIS 176 began north from the Illinois state line. It then turns west and then north to South Wayne. In South Wayne, it meets WIS 11. Continuing north, it crosses the Pecatonica River and then turns northwest before ending at WIS 78.

History
Initially, WIS 176 used to be part of CTH-D. During its existence, there was no significant changes to the routing. In 1999, it was decommissioned and then reverted to its former CTH counterpart.

Major intersections

See also

References

176
Transportation in Lafayette County, Wisconsin